The 1995 Cincinnati Bearcats football team represented the University of Cincinnati during the 1995 NCAA Division I-A football season. The Bearcats, led by second-year head coach Rick Minter, participated as independents and played their home games at Nippert Stadium.

Schedule

References

Cincinnati
Cincinnati Bearcats football seasons
Cincinnati Bearcats football